False Flag is a 2017 Nigerian movie produced and directed by Allwell Ademola.

Plot
A man who refuses to get married, later finds love in a woman who is HIV positive. The family of the man are unhappy with the relationship and they want him to call-off the relationship.

Cast
 Gabriel Afolayan
 Aisha Lawal
 Wumi Toriola
 Allwell Ademola

Awards and nominations

References

2017 films
English-language Nigerian films
2010s English-language films